Presearch may refer to:

 Presearch, a UK laboratory services company acquired by UDG Healthcare
 Presearch, a distributed search engine